This article lists the largest human settlements in the world (by population) over time, as estimated by historians, from 7000 BC when the largest populated place in the world was a proto-city in the Ancient Near East with a population of about 1,000–2,000 people, to the year 2000 when the largest urban area was Tokyo with 26 million. Alexandria, Rome, or Baghdad may have been the first city to have 1,000,000 people, as early as 100 BC or as late as 925 AD. They were later surpassed by Constantinople, Chang'an, Kaifeng, Hangzhou, Jinling, Beijing, Edo, London (the first city to reach 2 million), and New York (the first to top 10 million), among others, before Tokyo took the crown in the mid-20th century. As of 2020, the Greater Tokyo Area is the most populous metropolitan area in the world, with more than 37.393 million residents.

Many of the figures are uncertain, especially in ancient times. Estimating population sizes before censuses were conducted is a difficult task.

List of the most populous human settlements over time 
The following table lists the most populous human settlements by estimated population at specified points in history according to three sources: Ian Morris, George Modelski and Tertius Chandler. City names are in bold where all three sources agree. It shows the evolution of the largest settlement from proto-city to city to urban area to metropolitan area.

See also 
 Historical urban community sizes, 7000 BC – 1875
 List of largest European cities in history
 List of largest cities, present day
 Estimates of historical world population

References

External links 
 Top Ten Cities Through History, animation showing the ten largest cities throughout history according to Chandler
 Top 20 Most Populated Cities in The World 1500 to 2100 (History + Projection) 

Urban geography
Historical geography
Lists of cities by population
Lists of cities (worldwide) by population
Largest cities
Demographic history
Cities-related lists of superlatives
History-related lists of superlatives
Largest things